A diffuser is "a device for reducing the velocity and increasing the static pressure of a fluid passing through a system”. The fluid's static pressure rise as it passes through a duct is commonly referred to as pressure recovery.  In contrast, a nozzle is used to increase the discharge velocity and lower the pressure of a fluid passing through it.

Frictional effects during analysis can sometimes be important, but usually they are neglected. Ducts containing fluids flowing at low velocity can usually be analyzed using Bernoulli's principle.  Analyzing ducts flowing at higher velocities with Mach numbers in excess of 0.3 usually require compressible flow relations.

A typical subsonic diffuser is a duct that increases in area in the direction of flow. As the area increases, fluid velocity decreases, and static pressure rises.

Supersonic Diffusers

A supersonic diffuser is a duct that decreases in area in the direction of flow which causes the fluid temperature, pressure, and density to increase, and velocity to decrease. These changes occur because the fluid is compressible. Shock waves may also play an important role in a supersonic diffuser.

Applications 

Diffusers are very common in heating, ventilating, and air-conditioning systems.  Diffusers are used on both all-air and air-water HVAC systems, as part of room air distribution subsystems, and serve several purposes:

 To deliver both conditioning and ventilating air
 Evenly distribute the flow of air, in the desired directions
 To enhance mixing of room air into the primary air being discharged
 Often to cause the air jet(s) to attach to a ceiling or other surface, taking advantage of the Coandă effect
 To create low-velocity air movement in the occupied portion of room
 Accomplish the above while producing the minimum amount of noise

When possible, dampers, extractors, and other flow control devices should not be placed near diffusers' inlets (necks), either not being used at all or being placed far upstream.  They have been shown to dramatically increase noise production.  For as-cataloged diffuser performance, a straight section of duct needs serve a diffuser.  An elbow, or kinked flex duct, just before a diffuser often leads to poor air distribution and increased noise.

Diffusers can be as a shape of round, rectangular,  or can be as linear slot diffusers (LSDs), e.g.: Linear slot diffusers takes the form of one or several long, narrow slots, mostly semi-concealed in a fixed or suspended ceiling with airfoils behind the slots directing the airflow in the desired direction.

Occasionally, diffusers are mostly used in reverse fashion, as air inlets or returns. This is especially true for Linear slot diffuser and 'perf' diffusers.  But more commonly, grilles are used as return or exhaust air inlets.

See also
 Bernoulli's principle
 Compressible flow
 Duct (flow)
 Mass flow rate
 Air conditioning
 ASHRAE
 SMACNA
 Nozzle

References

Ventilation
Building engineering